Frederick Templeton Manheim Kissel  (27 March 188115 July 1962) was a New Zealand engineer and engineering administrator. He was born in Templeton, New Zealand, on 27 March 1881.

In the 1948 King's Birthday Honours, Kissel was appointed a Companion of the Imperial Service Order.

References

1881 births
1962 deaths
People from North Canterbury
20th-century New Zealand engineers
New Zealand mechanical engineers
New Zealand public servants
20th-century New Zealand public servants
New Zealand Companions of the Imperial Service Order